Jim R. Trujillo is an American politician and businessman who served as a Democratic member of the New Mexico House of Representatives from 2003 to 2020. Trujillo was appointed by Governor Bill Richardson to fill the vacancy caused by the resignation of Patsy Trujillo (no relation).

Education
Trujillo graduated from Pojoaque High School and studied architecture at the College of Santa Fe (now the Santa Fe University of Art and Design).

Career 
A businessman, Trujillo owned an operated a store. He was appointed to the New Mexico House of Representatives in 2003. In 2019, he announced that he would not seek re-election in 2020.

On September 29, 2020, Trujillo resigned from his seat prior to the end of his term, citing health concerns. After Trujillo's resignation, it was announced that the Santa Fe County Commission would appoint an interim successor to serve for the remainder of Trujillo's term. In October 2020, Linda Serrato, a businesswoman and former political advisor to Ben Ray Luján, was selected to fill the remainder of Trujilo's term.

References

External links
Official page at the New Mexico Legislature

Jim Trujillo at Ballotpedia
Jim R. Trujillo at OpenSecrets

Place of birth missing (living people)
Year of birth missing (living people)
Living people
Hispanic and Latino American state legislators in New Mexico
Democratic Party members of the New Mexico House of Representatives
Politicians from Santa Fe, New Mexico
Santa Fe University of Art and Design alumni
21st-century American politicians